Yogyakarta Airport may refer to: 

 Yogyakarta International Airport, the airport of Kulon Progo Regency, Special Region of Yogyakarta, Indonesia
 Adisutjipto Airport, in Sleman Regency, Special Region of Yogyakarta, Indonesia